International Education Corporation (IEC) is the parent company of UEI College, United Education Institute, Florida Career College, U.S. Colleges and Sage Truck Driving Schools. The institutions are post secondary with a focus on career education in California, Arizona, Georgia, Florida, Nevada, Washington and Texas.

Accreditation
The Accrediting Council for Continuing Education and Training (ACCET) accredits UEI College in Huntington Park, Anaheim, Chula Vista, West Covina, Encino, Ontario, San Marcos, Stockton, Phoenix, and Morrow campuses. The Council on Occupational Education (COE) accredits Florida Career College locations in Miami, Hialeah, Boynton Beach, Houston, Jacksonville, Lauderdale Lakes, Margate, Orlando, Pembroke Pines, Tampa and West Palm Beach. The Accrediting Commission of Career Schools and Colleges (ACCSC) accredits the Bakersfield, Gardena, Fresno, Sacramento, Las Vegas, and Riverside locations. The institutions' accreditors are listed by the U.S. Department of Education as nationally recognized accrediting agencies.

Staff
Fardad Fateri, Ph.D.- The Chairman, President and CEO
Shoukry Tiab - Chief Operating Officer
Sanjay Sardana - Chief Financial Officer

History
IEC was originally founded in 1982 in Los Angeles, California, with the name United Electronics Institute. In 1998, IEC acquired Advanced Career Training (ACT), and ACT became United Education Institute (UEI) in January 2010. In 2009, the eight Southern California United Education Institute campuses became UEI College. As of April 2022, IEC operates 37 campuses nationwide in seven states.

In May 2022, IEC acquired the Sage Corporation, which operates Sage Truck Driving Schools. Sage operates 22 campuses in 12 states, including Colorado, Florida, Idaho, Indiana, Montana, North Carolina, New York (state), Pennsylvania, South Carolina, Texas, Utah and Wyoming.

Dismissed lawsuit
In 2020, IEC was sued by two students who claimed in the lawsuit that IEC Corp.'s subsidiary Florida Career College targeted economically vulnerable minorities with predatory practices. The case was closed by the U.S. District Judge Roy Altman in September 2021, who also ordered to submit disputes through individual arbitration.

References 

1982 establishments in California
Educational organizations based in the United States
For-profit universities and colleges in the United States